Sheikh Joaan bin Hamad bin Khalifa Al Thani (born 23 July 1986) is a senior member of the House of Thani. He is the fifth son of former Emir of Qatar, Sheikh Hamad bin Khalifa Al Thani, and the third child of the Emir with his second wife, Sheikha Moza bint Nasser Al-Missned. He is president of the Qatar Olympic Committee.

Education and career
Sheikh Joaan Bin Hamad was educated at École spéciale militaire de Saint-Cyr, France. 
He also attended Oak Ridge Military Academy in the city of Oak Ridge, North Carolina. He was the Torch relay ambassador on the 2006 Asian Games in Doha.

In May 2015, he was appointed president of the Qatar Olympic Committee. He served as president of the Organising Committee of the 24th Men's Handball World Championship Qatar 2015.

Sheikh Joaan bin Hamad is chairman of the Doha 2030 Asian Games Bid Committee which won the bid for the 2030 Asian Games.

In 2020, he received a master's degree in Business Administration from HEC Paris in Qatar.

On 9 August 2022, Sheikh Joaan attended the opening ceremony of the 5th edition of the 2021 Islamic Solidarity Games, which was opened by Turkish President Recep Tayyip Erdoğan in Konya, Turkey.

Marriage and children
Sheikh Joaan married at Al-Wajbah Palace, Doha, on 24 April 2008, with Sheikha Al-Maha bint Salem Al-Rumul Al-Mannai, daughter of Salem Al-Rumul Al-Mannai. Together they have four sons and three daughters.
Sheikh Hamad bin Joaan bin Hamad Al Thani , (born 20 november 2009)
Sheikh Tamim bin Joaan bin Hamad Al Thani, (born 21 September 2010)
Sheikha Al-Dhabi bint Joaan bin Hamad Al Thani, (born 25 April 2012)
Sheikh Khalifa bin Joaan bin Hamad Al Thani, (born 3 March 2014)
Sheikha Moza bint Joaan bin Hamad Al Thani, (born 2 November 2015)
Sheikh Jassim bin Joaan bin Hamad Al Thani, (born 7 March 2018)
Sheikha Maryam bint Joaan bin Hamad Al Thani, (born 28 January 2020)

Ancestry

References

Joaan Bin Hamad Bin Khalifa
Living people
École Spéciale Militaire de Saint-Cyr alumni
1986 births
Owners of Prix de l'Arc de Triomphe winners
Sons of monarchs